The Coll de Can Bordoi is a mountain pass on the B-510 road across the Catalan Coastal Range from Dosrius to Llinars del Vallès. The pass lies in the municipality of Llinars del Vallès, comarca of Vallès Oriental, province of Barcelona, Catalonia, Spain.

The GR 92 long distance footpath, which roughly follows the length of the Mediterranean coast of Spain, has a staging point on the pass.

References 

Can Bordoi